William James Cameron "Will" Calnan (born 17 April 1996) is an English field hockey player who plays as a forward for Hampstead & Westminster and the England and Great Britain national teams. 

He is a former pupil of St Andrew's School in Woking and Cranleigh School, Surrey. He is also an alumnus of Kingston University, having graduated with a degree in business management.

Club career
Calnan plays club hockey in the Men's England Hockey League Premier Division for Hampstead & Westminster.
He has previously played for Surbiton.

International career
He made his senior Great Britain national team debut against Belgium, on 14 June 2018.

References

External links

1996 births
Living people
English male field hockey players
British male field hockey players
Male field hockey forwards
2018 Men's Hockey World Cup players
Surbiton Hockey Club players
Hampstead & Westminster Hockey Club players
Men's England Hockey League players
2023 Men's FIH Hockey World Cup players